The Pine Bluff Fifth Avenue Historic District encompasses a small neighborhood of high quality homes, most of them built before 1915.  It includes 3-1/2 blocks of Fifth Avenue, the matching section of Fourth Avenue, and houses on the connecting streets.  The area was home to main of Pine Bluff's political and business elites from the late 19th century onward, and includes a number the city's finest Queen Anne Victorian houses.

The district was listed on the National Register of Historic Places in 1980.

See also
National Register of Historic Places listings in Jefferson County, Arkansas

References

Buildings and structures completed in 1886
Historic districts on the National Register of Historic Places in Arkansas
Houses in Pine Bluff, Arkansas
National Register of Historic Places in Pine Bluff, Arkansas
Queen Anne architecture in Arkansas